Jeleń  is a village in the administrative district of Gmina Borne Sulinowo, within Szczecinek County, West Pomeranian Voivodeship, in north-western Poland.

See also
History of Pomerania

References

Villages in Szczecinek County